Akkoyun (a Turkish word meaning "white sheep") may refer to:

People with the surname
 Fırat Akkoyun, Turkish footballer

Places
 Akkoyunlu, Başmakçı, a village in Afyonkarahisar Province, Turkey
 Akkoyunlu, Çobanlar, a village in Afyonkarahisar Province, Turkey

See also
 Ak Koyunlu, Oghuz Turkic tribal federation

Turkish-language surnames